Frank Wayenberg (August 27, 1898 – April 16, 1975) was a Major League Baseball pitcher who played for one season. He pitched in two games for the Cleveland Indians during the 1924 Cleveland Indians season.

External links

1898 births
1975 deaths
Major League Baseball pitchers
Cleveland Indians players
Baseball players from Kansas
People from Crawford County, Kansas